Hong Lim Constituency was a constituency in Chinatown, Singapore. It was created in 1959 and dissolved in 1976 but is currently part of Jalan Besar GRC (Kreta Ayer–Kim Seng).

The constituency dwindled in population since its creation. In 1968, 1,615 voters were shifted to Bukit Ho Swee. Later on, 5,162 voters were shifted to Serangoon private houses. The remaining people were merged into Telok Ayer.

Member of Parliament

Elections

Elections in 1950s

Elections in 1960s

References

Subdivisions of Singapore